The 1991–92 Pepperdine Waves men's basketball team represented Pepperdine University in the 1991–92 NCAA Division I men's basketball season. The team was led by head coach Tom Asbury. The Waves played their home games at the Firestone Fieldhouse and were members of the West Coast Conference. They finished the season 24–7, 14–0 in WCC play to win the regular season conference title by a 5-game margin. After completing an unbeaten record in the conference regular season, Pepperdine ran their conference winning streak to 27 consecutive games (33 games when including WCC Tournament play) and won the West Coast Conference tournament to receive the conference's automatic bid to the NCAA tournament for the second straight season. In the opening round, the Waves fell to Memphis State, 80–70.

Roster

Schedule and results

|-
!colspan=9 style=| Non-conference regular season

|-
!colspan=9 style=| WCC Regular Season

|-
!colspan=9 style=| WCC tournament

|-
!colspan=9 style=| NCAA tournament

Source

Awards and honors
Doug Christie – WCC Player of the Year
Tom Asbury – WCC Coach of the Year

References

Pepperdine Waves men's basketball seasons
Pepperdine
Pepperdine
Pepperdine Waves Men's Basketball
Pepperdine Waves Men's Basketball